Dear J is a 2008 Independent Film drama by CubeCity Entertainment. Directed by Roberto Munoz and Mann Munoz. The film is the story of an evangelist who admits himself to a psychiatric institution after the death of his agnostic girlfriend.

Plot
Dear J is about an evangelist, James Jamisin (Joseph Halsey), who must cope with the unexpected death of his agnostic girlfriend: Paige (Maya Serhan). To sort things out, James admits himself into Logous Psychiatric Institute, where he replays a make-believe Trial in his mind over and over again. The Trial is presided over by a no-nonsense imaginary Judge (played by Karen Lynn Gorney) and is animated by an array of off-the-wall characters. Some of the witnesses called to the stand are inspired by real-life individuals, like the literary scholar and apologist C.S. Lewis (Patrick Mitchell). Throughout the movie, his psychologist, Dr. Frolick (Allison Lane) tries to get him to open the letter Paige wrote to him just before her death—a letter he has been carrying around and refuses to read. Trouble brews when the head of the institute, Dr. Donovin (Carson Grant), plans on foiling all attempts to bring James to a resolution.

Production notes
Formerly entitled Liars and Lunatics, the movie was released on DVD as Dear J in 2008. The movie was filmed in 2006 in Whitestone, Queens, and also in Putnam County, New York.

The Dove Foundation gave the movie four doves and its seal of approval (recommended for ages 12 and over). Author and historian, Dr. Paul Maier, said of the film: "I thoroughly enjoyed the film... I was blown away by the sheer professionalism of it all: the characters were convincing, the plot nicely paced."

Cast
 Joseph A. Halsey as James Jamisin
 Allison Lane as Dr. M. Frolick
 Carson Grant as Dr. Donovin
 Maya Serhan as Paige
 Patrick Mitchell as Staples
 Karen Lynn Gorney as the Judge
 Amanda Michelle Short as Avie
 Hudson Chambers as Davie
 Bruce Nicholls as Philosopher Hume
 Heidi Azaro as Mother Parrot
 Ron Kuriloff as Prof. Boltmaniac

References

External links
 
 

2008 films
2008 drama films
American drama films
2000s English-language films
Films directed by Mann Munoz
2000s American films